IMC International Metalworking Companies B.V., otherwise known as IMC Group, is the second largest company for metalworking products. With 14 member companies, today IMC supplies carbide metalworking tools. Together they produces a wide range of carbide inserts, carbide endmills and cutting tools covering all metal cutting applications.  The IMC Group is in the automotive, aerospace, die and mold, general engineering, bearing manufacturing and oil and gas industries.

Berkshire Hathaway acquisition
In 2006, Berkshire Hathaway and Iscar announced Berkshire acquired 80% of the Iscar Metalworking Companies (IMC) at a value for the whole group of US$5 billion.

In 2013, Berkshire Hathaway and Iscar announced that Berkshire acquired 20% of IMC and it is now holding 100% of IMC's equity.

Subsidiaries 
Today, the IMC Group has over 130 subsidiaries in 65 countries.

Primary Subsidiaries:
 ISCAR Metalworking 
 TaeguTec
 Tungaloy Corporation
 Ingersoll Cutting Tools

References

Berkshire Hathaway
Manufacturing companies of Israel
Manufacturing companies established in 1952
Conglomerate companies of Israel
Multinational companies
1952 establishments in Israel